Physical computing involves interactive systems that can sense and respond to the world around them. While this definition is broad enough to encompass systems such as smart automotive traffic control systems or factory automation processes, it is not commonly used to describe them. In a broader sense, physical computing is a creative framework for understanding human beings' relationship to the digital world. In practical use, the term most often describes handmade art, design or DIY hobby projects that use sensors and microcontrollers to translate analog input to a software system, and/or control electro-mechanical devices such as motors, servos, lighting or other hardware.

Physical computing intersects the range of activities often referred to in academia and industry as electrical engineering, mechatronics, robotics, computer science, and especially embedded development.

Examples 

Physical computing is used in a wide variety of domains and applications.

Education
The advantage of physicality in education and playfulness has been reflected in diverse informal learning environments. The Exploratorium, a pioneer in inquiry based learning, developed some of the earliest interactive exhibitry involving computers, and continues to include more and more examples of physical computing and tangible interfaces as associated technologies progress.

Art
In the art world, projects that implement physical computing include the work of Scott Snibbe, Daniel Rozin, Rafael Lozano-Hemmer, Jonah Brucker-Cohen, and Camille Utterback.

Product design
Physical computing practices also exist in the product and interaction design sphere, where hand-built embedded systems are sometimes used to rapidly prototype new digital product concepts in a cost-efficient way. Firms such as IDEO and Teague are known to approach product design in this way.

Commercial applications
Commercial implementations range from consumer devices such as the Sony Eyetoy or games such as Dance Dance Revolution to more esoteric and pragmatic uses including machine vision utilized in the automation of quality inspection along a factory assembly line. Exergaming, such as Nintendo's Wii Fit, can be considered a form of physical computing. Other implementations of physical computing include voice recognition, which senses and interprets sound waves via microphones or other soundwave sensing devices, and computer vision, which applies algorithms to a rich stream of video data typically sensed by some form of camera. Haptic interfaces are also an example of physical computing, though in this case the computer is generating the physical stimulus as opposed to sensing it. Both motion capture and gesture recognition are fields that rely on computer vision to work their magic.

Scientific applications
Physical computing can also describe the fabrication and use of custom sensors or collectors for scientific experiments, though the term is rarely used to describe them as such. An example of physical computing modeling is the Illustris project, which attempts to precisely simulate the evolution of the universe from the Big Bang to the present day, 13.8 billion years later.

Methods 
Prototyping plays an important role in Physical computing. Tools like the Wiring, Arduino and Fritzing as well as I-CubeX help designers and artists to quickly prototype their interactive concepts.

Further reading

References

External links 

 Arduino, a highly popular open source physical computing platform
 Raspberry Pi, complete computer with GPIO's to interact with the world, huge community, many tutorials available.  Many Linux distros available as well as Windows IoT and OS-less unikernel RTL's such as Ultibo Core.
 BeagleBone, a complete Linux computer with GPIO's, but a little less flexible
 FoxBoard (and others), yet another Linux computer with GPIO, but with little information
Arieh Robotics Project Junior]. A Windows 7 based Physical Computing PC built using Microsoft Robotics Developer Studio.
 BluePD BlueSense. a physical computing platform by Blue Melon. This platform is visually programmable using the popular (open source) Pure Data system.
  Daniel Rozin Artist Page, bitforms gallery, features images and video of Daniel Rozin's interactive installations and sculptures.
  Dwengo, a PIC microcontroller based computing platform that comes with a Breadboard for easy prototyping.
 EmbeddedLab, A research lab situated within the Department of Computer Aided Architecture Design at  ETH Zürich.
 Fritzing - from prototype to product: a software, which supports designers and artists to take the step from physical prototyping to actual product.
 GP3, another popular choice that allows building physical systems with PCs and traditional languages (C, Basic, Java, etc.) or standalone using a point and click development tool.
 Physical Computing, Interactive Telecommunications Program, New York University
 Physical Computing by Dan O'Sullivan
 Physical Computing, Tom Igoe's collection of resources, examples, and lecture notes for the physical computing courses at ITP.
 Physical Computing, A path into electronics using an approach of “learning by making”, introducing electronic prototyping in a playful, non-technical way. (Yaniv Steiner, IDII)
 Theremino, an open source modular system for interfacing transducers (sensors and actuators) via USB to PC, notebooks, netbooks, tablets and cellphones.

 
Applications of computer vision
User interfaces
Design
Digital art
Virtual reality
Computer systems